Brookfield is an unincorporated community and census-designated place (CDP) located within White Township, in Warren County, New Jersey, United States. As of the 2010 United States Census, the CDP's population was 675.

Geography
According to the United States Census Bureau, Brookfield had a total area of 0.212 square miles (0.548 km2), including 0.211 square miles (0.546 km2) of land and 0.001 square miles (0.002 km2) of water (0.35%).

Demographics

Census 2010

References

Census-designated places in Warren County, New Jersey
White Township, New Jersey